Anatrachyntis haemodryas is a moth in the family Cosmopterigidae. Described by Edward Meyrick in 1930, it can also be found at Peninsular Malaysia.

References

Moths described in 1930
Anatrachyntis
Moths of Asia